George Eugene Mitterwald (born June 7, 1945) is an American former professional baseball player, coach and manager. He played in 887 Major League Baseball games for the Minnesota Twins and Chicago Cubs, primarily as a catcher, over 11 seasons (1966; 1968–77). Mitterwald, nicknamed "the Baron", threw and batted right-handed.

He was traded from the Twins to the Cubs for Randy Hundley at the Winter Meetings on December 6, 1973. 

After his active career ended in minor league baseball in 1978, Mitterwald became the bullpen coach of the Oakland Athletics in 1979 under Marshall, then was retained when Martin replaced Marshall as Oakland's manager.

Mitterwald also managed the Modesto A's in 1983–85 and the Orlando Twins in 1986–87. During the mid-1990s, he was the manager of the independent Duluth–Superior Dukes team. In 1997, he led the team to the Northern League Championship. He coached female pro pitcher Ila Borders while managing the Dukes.

References

External links

1945 births
Living people
Baseball players from Berkeley, California
Charlotte Hornets (baseball) players
Chicago Cubs players
Denver Bears players
Florida Instructional League Twins players
Major League Baseball bullpen coaches
Major League Baseball catchers
Minnesota Twins players
Minor league baseball managers
New York Yankees coaches
Oakland Athletics coaches
San Jose Missions players
Sportspeople from Berkeley, California
St. Cloud Rox players
Tigres de Aragua players
American expatriate baseball players in Venezuela
Wilson Tobs players
Wisconsin Rapids Twins players
United States Army soldiers
United States Army reservists